Delaware's at-large congressional district is a congressional district that includes the entire U.S. state of Delaware. It is the nation's oldest congressional district, having existed uninterrupted since the 1st United States Congress in 1789. Delaware has always had only one member of the United States House of Representatives, except for a single decade from 1813 and 1823, when the state had two at-large members.  The two seats were filled by a statewide ballot, with the two candidates receiving the highest votes being elected.

Mike Castle, a Republican and former Governor of Delaware, held this seat from January 1993 until his retirement in January 2011, after his unsuccessful bid for the Republican nomination to run for U.S. Senator.  Even as Delaware swung heavily Democratic at the state and national level, Castle was usually reelected without serious difficulty. Since his retirement, however, the Democrats have held it with no substantive opposition.

The district is currently represented by Lisa Blunt Rochester, a Democrat.

Recent statewide results

List of members representing the district

Second at-large seat: 1813–1823 
From 1813 to 1823, Delaware elected two members of the United States House of Representatives. Both were elected statewide at-large. Four men held the second seat during that decade.

Electoral history

1920

1922

1924

1926

1928

1930

1932

1934

1936

1938

1940

1980

1982

1984

1986

1988

1990

1992

1994

1996

1998

2000

2002

2004

2006

2008

2010

2012

2014

2016

2018

2020

2022

Notes

References

External links 
 

At-large
At-large United States congressional districts
Constituencies established in 1789
1789 establishments in Delaware